David Bižić (born 25 November 1975) is an operatic baritone. He was born in Belgrade, Serbia.

Early life
Bižić was born in Belgrade, Serbia. He studied archaeology. before he pursued vocal arts. His father was a physical chemist and his mother is a psychologist.

His love for opera, he states, started at early age being exposed to opera records at home, especially The Three Tenors concerts. Two of the four main artists from those recordings, Zubin Mehta and by Placido Domingo conducted him later in the career.

 "I remember feeling really connected to Domingo, Pavarotti, the famous tenors.  I was seven or eight years old when I listened to them sing arias, and although I didn’t know what they were singing about, I could feel the emotion and passion, and that spoke so much to me. I also did conducting at home and became passionate about expressing myself through music. But I had no idea that I would become an opera singer. It was never on my list of possible professions."

Education and early career

In 2000 at the age of 24 he started studying voice at the Jerusalem Academy of Music and Dance with Bibiana Goldenthal. He later continued his education with International Vocal Arts Institute (IVAI) and apprenticed with the Israeli Opera YAP and Paris National Opera – Atelier Lyrique program.

He has participated in numerous master classes and concerts in France, Israel, New York and Japan working with José van Dam, Teresa Berganza and Gabriel Bacquier among others.

Singing career

After his musical training in Tel Aviv, Paris and New York, Bizic's principal role debut was in the title role of Mozart's Le Nozze di Figaro in Nantes, in 2006. During that same time, he was awarded the AROP Prix lyrique by the Paris National Opera, and has won the second prize of Operalia world opera competition.

Bižić has since appeared in major opera houses and festivals across Europe and America.

Bižić's career first garnered international attention in the role of Masetto in two critically acclaimed productions of Don Giovanni by Michael Haneke in Paris opera and Dmitry Tcherniakov in Aix-en-Provence Festival. He later revived both of those productions, now in the role of Leporello.

In 2014 Bižić made his debut at the Metropolitan Opera in New York singing Albert in Werther alongside Jonas Kaufmann and Sophie Koch and came back the following season to sing Marcello (La Bohème). He has been back to the Metopera every season after that having sung more than 50 shows so far.

Opera

As an interpreter of Mozart roles, most notably Don Giovanni, Leporello and Masetto in Don Giovanni, Almaviva and Figaro in The Marriage of Figaro, Guglielmo and Don Alfonso in Così fan tutte, Bižić has performed in Paris Opera, Wiener Staatsoper, Los Angeles Opera, Teatro Real, Bolshoi Theatre, Bordeaux, Geneve, Ravinia Festival, Valencia, Toulouse, Deutsche Oper Berlin, Maribor, Montpellier, Rennes, Saint Etienne, Rouen, Aix en Provence, Dijon, Nantes and Strasbourg.

Other career highlights include his Metropolitan Opera debut as Albert in Werther, Albert and Schaunard in Royal Opera House, debut in Teatro Liceo as Puccini's Manon Lescaut, Marcello and Sharpless in the Metropolitan Opera, title role of Eugene Onegin in Limoges, Metz and Tel Aviv, Lucia di Lammermoors Enrico in Toulon Opera, Zurga in Bizet's Les pêcheurs de perles in Bordeaux and Dortmund, Escamillo (Carmen) in Tel Aviv, Belgrade, Stockholm, Dijon and Macerata Opera, and High Priest of Dagon (Samson et Dalila) in Royal Swedish Opera.

Concerts

In opera concert performances Bizic has sung Sharples in Puccini's Madama Butterfly with the Hallé Orchestra conducted by Sir Mark Elder.

He has also performed Leporello in Mozart's Don Giovanni in Ravinia Festival with Chicago Symphony Orchestra under James Conlon, La Vida Breve with the Orchestre de Paris conducted by Rafael Frühbeck de Burgos, and Zurga from Bizet's Les Pecheurs des Perles with WDR Rundfunkorchester Köln under Friedrich Haider.

His other concert appearances include Beethoven's 9th Symphony with the Orchestre de Montpellier and the Orchestre de Bordeaux under Marc Minkowski, Zeisl's Requiem Ebraico with the Israel Philharmonic Orchestra under Zubin Mehta, Fauré's Requiem with the Ensemble Orchestral de Paris / Accentus Choir for the Saint Denis Festival conducted by Laurence Equilbey and Brahms' Ein deutsches Requiem with the Serbian Radio TV Symphony Orchestra.

Personal life

Bižić lives in Bordeaux, France. He is married and has two children. Bižić can also play piano and didjeridoo. He is a brother of Dr. Mina Bizic

Awards
Bižić is a winner of the second prize from Operalia, The World Opera Competition in 2007 and Paris Opera AROP Prix Lyriques in 2005.

Recordings

 La Bohéme – Puccini (Marcello)
 Sergio Alapont, Irish National Opera
 Signum Classics SKU: SIGCD702 – CD 
 Released 2022

 Requiem Ebraico – Zeisl
 Zubin Mehta, Israel Philharmonic Orchestra
 Helicon Classics 02-9625 – CD
 Released 2006

 L'Amour des trois oranges – Prokofiev
 Sylvain Cambreling, Paris National Opera
 TDK – DVD
 Released 2006

 Don Giovanni – Mozart (Leporello)
 Antony Hermus, Rennes Opera
 Culturebox streaming 
 Released 2010

 La Bohéme – Puccini (Schaunard)
 Sir Mark Elder, Royal Opera House
 ROH Live Cinema Season
 Released 2012

 Werther – Massenet (Albert)
 Alain Altinoglu, Metropolitan Opera
 Met Opera on Demand
 Released 2014

 Don Giovanni – Mozart (Masetto)
 Louis Langrée, Festival d’Aix-en-Provence 
 BelAir Classiques – BAC611, BAC480 – DVD, BLU-RAY 
 Released 2013

 Werther – Massenet (Albert)
 Antonio Pappano, Royal Opera House
 ROH Live Cinema Season
 Released 2016

 Manon Lescaut – Puccini (Lescaut)
 Emmanuel Villaume, Gran Teatre del Liceu
 Mezzo TV
 Released 2018

 Hipishizik Metafizik – Rambo Amadeus
 PGP RTS – 416934 CD 
 Released 2008

 References NotesSources'''

 
 
 L'Opéra vu par Alain Duault & Colette Masson, Hugo & Cie, 2010 
 La Bohème, Puccini : livret bilingue, guide d'écoute, genèse et création, sources littéraires, profil des rôles, discographie, vidéographie '', Premières loges, 2014

External links
Official website
OperaBase.com Schedule
David Bizic in an excerpt from Don Giovanni
Official Facebook fan page

1975 births
Living people
21st-century Serbian male opera singers
Serbian baritones
Operalia, The World Opera Competition prize-winners
Operatic baritones
21st-century Israeli male opera singers